Tony Morelli (May 16, 1956 - April 19, 2015) was a Canadian stuntman and martial artist.

Morelli's stunt career began in 1983, and took part in various film and television projects, including Walls, Airwolf, Legends of the Fall, The X-Files, The 6th Day, Smallville, X-Men: The Last Stand, 2012, The Twilight Saga: New Moon, Rise of the Planet of the Apes, The Cabin in the Woods, Arrow and Godzilla.

Morelli died suddenly on April 19, 2015, aged 58. He is survived by his wife and children.

References

External links 

1956 births
2015 deaths
Canadian stunt performers